Daniel R. Hawkins (born November 1, 1960) is an American politician. He has served as a Republican member for the 100th district in the Kansas House of Representatives since 2013.  In 2017, the American Conservative Union gave him a lifetime rating of 78%.

References

|-

1960 births
21st-century American politicians
Emporia State University alumni
Hutchinson Community College alumni
Living people
Politicians from Wichita, Kansas
Republican Party members of the Kansas House of Representatives